The 1984–85 Cleveland Cavaliers season was the 15th NBA basketball season in Cleveland, Ohio.

Draft picks

Roster

Regular season

Season standings

Notes
 z, y – division champions
 x – clinched playoff spot

Record vs. opponents

Game log

|- align="center" bgcolor="#ffcccc"
| 1
| October 26, 1984
| @ Philadelphia
| L 101–111
|
|
|
| The Spectrum
| 0–1
|- align="center" bgcolor="#ffcccc"
| 2
| October 27, 1984
| New Jersey
| L 106–131
|
|
|
| Richfield Coliseum
| 0–2
|- align="center" bgcolor="#ffcccc"
| 3
| October 30, 1984
| @ Detroit
| L 107–124
|
|
|
| Pontiac Silverdome
| 0–3

|- align="center" bgcolor="#ffcccc"
| 4
| November 2, 1984
| Indiana
| L 109–116
|
|
|
| Richfield Coliseum
| 0–4
|- align="center" bgcolor="#ffcccc"
| 5
| November 3, 1984
| @ Milwaukee
| L 88–117
|
|
|
| MECCA Arena
| 0–5
|- align="center" bgcolor="#ffcccc"
| 6
| November 5, 1984
| Detroit
| L 98–107
|
|
|
| Richfield Coliseum
| 0–6
|- align="center" bgcolor="#ffcccc"
| 7
| November 8, 1984
| @ Phoenix
| L 111–112
|
|
|
| Arizona Veterans Memorial Coliseum
| 0–7
|- align="center" bgcolor="#ffcccc"
| 8
| November 10, 1984
| @ San Antonio
| L 103–127
|
|
|
| HemisFair Arena
| 0–8
|- align="center" bgcolor="#ffcccc"
| 9
| November 13, 1984
| @ Houston
| L 98–106
|
|
|
| The Summit
| 0–9
|- align="center" bgcolor="#ccffcc"
| 10
| November 15, 19847:30p.m. EST
| @ Atlanta
| W 102–99
| Free (18)
|
| Bagley (9)
| The Omni3,836
| 1–9
|- align="center" bgcolor="#ffcccc"
| 11
| November 17, 1984
| @ New York
| L 88–112
|
|
|
| Madison Square Garden
| 1–10
|- align="center" bgcolor="#ffcccc"
| 12
| November 21, 1984
| New York
| L 101–109
|
|
|
| Richfield Coliseum
| 1–11
|- align="center" bgcolor="#ffcccc"
| 13
| November 23, 1984
| Golden State
| L 106–107
|
|
|
| Richfield Coliseum
| 1–12
|- align="center" bgcolor="#ccffcc"
| 14
| November 25, 19848:00p.m. EST
| Atlanta
| W 118–111
| Davis (20)
|
| Bagley (13)
| Richfield Coliseum3,630
| 2–12
|- align="center" bgcolor="#ffcccc"
| 15
| November 27, 1984
| Portland
| L 106–115
|
|
|
| Richfield Coliseum
| 2–13

|- align="center" bgcolor="#ffcccc"
| 16
| December 1, 1984
| Boston
| L 104–110
|
|
|
| Richfield Coliseum
| 2–14
|- align="center" bgcolor="#ffcccc"
| 17
| December 2, 1984
| @ Boston
| L 99–122
|
|
|
| Boston Garden
| 2–15
|- align="center" bgcolor="#ffcccc"
| 18
| December 4, 19847:30p.m. EST
| L.A. Lakers
| L 112–116
| Hubbard (37)
| Hubbard (8)
| Davis (10)
| Richfield Coliseum11,298
| 2–16
|- align="center" bgcolor="#ffcccc"
| 19
| December 8, 1984
| Denver
| L 108–114
|
|
|
| Richfield Coliseum
| 2–17
|- align="center" bgcolor="#ffcccc"
| 20
| December 11, 1984
| Milwaukee
| L 106–120
|
|
|
| Richfield Coliseum
| 2–18
|- align="center" bgcolor="#ffcccc"
| 21
| December 12, 19848:30 pm EST
| @ Atlanta
| L 99–116
| Thompson (23)
|
| Davis, Thompson, Wilson (4)
| Lakefront Arena3,082
| 2–19
|- align="center" bgcolor="#ccffcc"
| 22
| December 15, 1984
| New York
| W 102–97
|
|
|
| Richfield Coliseum
| 3–19
|- align="center" bgcolor="#ccffcc"
| 23
| December 18, 1984
| San Antonio
| W 118–110
|
|
|
| Richfield Coliseum
| 4–19
|- align="center" bgcolor="#ffcccc"
| 24
| December 20, 1984
| @ New York
| L 97–112
|
|
|
| Madison Square Garden
| 4–20
|- align="center" bgcolor="#ccffcc"
| 25
| December 22, 1984
| @ Indiana
| W 106–103
|
|
|
| Market Square Arena
| 5–20
|- align="center" bgcolor="#ccffcc"
| 26
| December 25, 19847:30p.m. EST
| Atlanta
| W 109–106
| Hubbard (28)
|
| Davis, Free (7)
| Richfield Coliseum4,216
| 6–20
|- align="center" bgcolor="#ffcccc"
| 27
| December 27, 1984
| @ Chicago
| L 108–112
|
|
|
| Chicago Stadium
| 6–21
|- align="center" bgcolor="#ffcccc"
| 28
| December 29, 1984
| Milwaukee
| L 102–115
|
|
|
| Richfield Coliseum
| 6–22

|- align="center" bgcolor="#ffcccc"
| 29
| January 2, 1985
| @ Detroit
| L 100–108
|
|
|
| Pontiac Silverdome
| 6–23
|- align="center" bgcolor="#ccffcc"
| 30
| January 3, 1985
| Washington
| W 100–93
|
|
|
| Richfield Coliseum
| 7–23
|- align="center" bgcolor="#ccffcc"
| 31
| January 5, 1985
| Phoenix
| W 111–106
|
|
|
| Richfield Coliseum
| 8–23
|- align="center" bgcolor="#ccffcc"
| 32
| January 8, 1985
| New Jersey
| W 107–101
|
|
|
| Richfield Coliseum
| 9–23
|- align="center" bgcolor="#ffcccc"
| 33
| January 11, 1985
| @ Milwaukee
| L 117–130
|
|
|
| MECCA Arena
| 9–24
|- align="center" bgcolor="#ccffcc"
| 34
| January 12, 1985
| Chicago
| W 101–98
|
|
|
| Richfield Coliseum
| 10–24
|- align="center" bgcolor="#ffcccc"
| 35
| January 14, 1985
| Washington
| L 91–101
|
|
|
| Richfield Coliseum
| 10–25
|- align="center" bgcolor="#ccffcc"
| 36
| January 15, 1985
| @ Kansas City
| W 116–112
|
|
|
| Kemper Arena
| 11–25
|- align="center" bgcolor="#ffcccc"
| 37
| January 17, 1985
| @ Chicago
| L 93–98
|
|
|
| Chicago Stadium
| 11–26
|- align="center" bgcolor="#ffcccc"
| 38
| January 19, 1985
| Seattle
| L 105–106
|
|
|
| Richfield Coliseum
| 11–27
|- align="center" bgcolor="#ffcccc"
| 39
| January 21, 1985
| @ Washington
| L 115–128
|
|
|
| Capital Centre
| 11–28
|- align="center" bgcolor="#ffcccc"
| 40
| January 22, 1985
| Philadelphia
| L 100–101
|
|
|
| Richfield Coliseum
| 11–29
|- align="center" bgcolor="#ccffcc"
| 41
| January 24, 1985
| @ Utah
| WL 110–109
|
|
|
| Salt Palace Acord Arennea
| 12–29
|- align="center" bgcolor="#ffcccc"
| 42
| January 26, 1985
| @ Denver
| L 127–144
|
|
|
| McNichols Sports Arena
| 12–30
|- align="center" bgcolor="#ccffcc"
| 43
| January 29, 1985
| L.A. Clippers
| W 110–94
|
|
|
| Richfield Coliseum
| 13–30
|- align="center" bgcolor="#ffcccc"
| 44
| January 30, 1985
| @ Indiana
| L 115–120
|
|
|
| Market Square Arena
| 13–31

|- align="center" bgcolor="#ffcccc"
| 45
| February 1, 19857:30p.m EST
| @ Atlanta
| L 108–126
| Free (27)
|
| Bagley (9)
| The Omni15,908
| 13–32
|- align="center" bgcolor="#ccffcc"
| 46
| February 2, 1985
| Kansas City
| W 124–106
|
|
|
| Richfield Coliseum
| 14–32
|- align="center" bgcolor="#ccffcc"
| 47
| February 4, 1985
| @ Washington
| W 121–112
|
|
|
| Capital Centre
| 15–32
|- align="center" bgcolor="#ffcccc"
| 48
| February 6, 1985
| @ Boston
| L 108–113
|
|
|
| Boston Garden
| 15–33
|- align="center" bgcolor="#ccffcc"
| 49
| February 7, 1985
| Chicago
| W 108–99
|
|
|
| Richfield Coliseum
| 16–33
|- align="center"
|colspan="9" bgcolor="#bbcaff"|All-Star Break
|- style="background:#cfc;"
|- bgcolor="#bbffbb"
|- align="center" bgcolor="#ffcccc"
| 50
| February 12, 1985
| Dallas
| L 1128–131
|
|
|
| Richfield Coliseum
| 16–34
|- align="center" bgcolor="#ffcccc"
| 51
| February 13, 1985
| @ New Jersey
| L 105–112
|
|
|
| Brendan Byrne Arena
| 16–35
|- align="center" bgcolor="#ccffcc"
| 52
| February 15, 1985
| @ Philadelphia
| W 112–107
|
|
|
| The Spectrum
| 17–35
|- align="center" bgcolor="#ffcccc"
| 53
| February 16, 1985
| Houston
| L 115–122
|
|
|
| Richfield Coliseum
| 17–36
|- align="center" bgcolor="#ccffcc"
| 54
| February 18, 1985
| Philadelphia
| W 120–113
|
|
|
| Richfield Coliseum
| 18–36
|- align="center" bgcolor="#ccffcc"
| 55
| February 20, 1985
| @ Indiana
| W 102–92
|
|
|
| Market Square Arena
| 19–36
|- align="center" bgcolor="#ffcccc"
| 56
| February 22, 1985
| Utah
| L 98–102
|
|
|
| Richfield Coliseum
| 19–37
|- align="center" bgcolor="#ccffcc"
| 57
| February 23, 1985
| Milwaukee
| W 128–106
|
|
|
| Richfield Coliseum
| 20–37
|- align="center" bgcolor="#ccffcc"
| 58
| February 26, 1985
| @ Chicago
| W 123–118 (OT)
|
|
|
| Chicago Stadium
| 21–37
|- align="center" bgcolor="#ccffcc"
| 59
| February 28, 1985
| @ Seattle
| W 120–95
|
|
|
| Kingdome
| 22–37

|- align="center" bgcolor="#ccffcc"
| 60
| March 1, 1985
| @ Portland
| W 111–103
|
|
|
| Memorial Coliseum
| 23–37
|- align="center" bgcolor="#ccffcc"
| 61
| March 4, 1985
| @ Golden State
| W 108–104
|
|
|
| Oakland-Alameda County Coliseum Arena
| 24–37
|- align="center" bgcolor="#ccffcc"
| 62
| March 6, 1985
| @ L.A. Clippers
| W 114–112
|
|
|
| Los Angeles Memorial Sports Arena
| 25–37
|- align="center" bgcolor="#ffcccc"
| 63
| March 9, 198511:00p.m. EST
| @ L.A. Lakers
| L 106–133
| Hinson, Turpin (18)
| Turpin (11)
| Bagley (6)
| The Forum17,505
| 25–38
|- align="center" bgcolor="#ccffcc"
| 64
| March 11, 1985
| Indiana
| W 122–110
|
|
|
| Richfield Coliseum
| 26–38
|- align="center" bgcolor="#ffcccc"
| 65
| March 13, 1985
| @ Milwaukee
| L 93–128
|
|
|
| MECCA Arena
| 26–39
|- align="center" bgcolor="#ffcccc"
| 66
| March 15, 1985
| Boston
| L 96–119
|
|
|
| Richfield Coliseum
| 26–40
|- align="center" bgcolor="#ccffcc"
| 67
| March 16, 1985
| @ Dallas
| W 135–128 (OT)
|
|
|
| Reunion Arena
| 27–40
|- align="center" bgcolor="#ccffcc"
| 68
| March 19, 1985
| Philadelphia
| W 116–89
|
|
|
| Richfield Coliseum
| 28–40
|- align="center" bgcolor="#ffcccc"
| 69
| March 20, 1985
| @ New Jersey
| L 108–128
|
|
|
| Brendan Byrne Arena
| 28–41
|- align="center" bgcolor="#ffcccc"
| 70
| March 22, 1985
| @ Boston
| L 117–129
|
|
|
| Boston Garden
| 28–42
|- align="center" bgcolor="#ffcccc"
| 71
| March 23, 19858:00p.m. EST
| Atlanta
| L 86–91 (OT)
| Free (17)
|
| Free (9)
| Richfield Coliseum16,787
| 28–43
|- align="center" bgcolor="#ccffcc"
| 72
| March 26, 1985
| New York
| W 112–98
|
|
|
| Richfield Coliseum
| 29–43
|- align="center" bgcolor="#ccffcc"
| 73
| March 28, 1985
| Chicago
| W 122–1140
|
|
|
| Richfield Coliseum
| 30–43
|- align="center" bgcolor="#ccffcc"
| 74
| March 30, 1985
| Indiana
| W 117–94
|
|
|
| Richfield Coliseum
| 31–43

|- align="center" bgcolor="#ccffcc"
| 75
| April 2, 1985
| Washington
| W 122–107
|
|
|
| Richfield Coliseum
| 32–43
|- align="center" bgcolor="#ccffcc"
| 76
| April 3, 1985
| @ Philadelphia
| W 113–110
|
|
|
| The Spectrum
| 33–43
|- align="center" bgcolor="#ccffcc"
| 77
| April 5, 1985
| @ Detroit
| W 119–118
|
|
|
| Joe Louis Arena
| 34–43
|- align="center" bgcolor="#ffcccc"
| 78
| April 6, 1985
| @ Washington
| L 101–109
|
|
|
| Capital Centre
| 34–44
|- align="center" bgcolor="#ccffcc"
| 79
| April 9, 1985
| New Jersey
| W 114–100
|
|
|
| Richfield Coliseum
| 35–44
|- align="center" bgcolor="#ffcccc"
| 80
| April 11, 1985
| Boston
| L 115–121
|
|
|
| Richfield Coliseum
| 35–45
|- align="center" bgcolor="#ccffcc"
| 81
| April 12, 1985
| @ New York
| W 109–108 (OT)
|
|
|
| Madison Square Garden
| 36–45
|- align="center" bgcolor="#ffcccc"
| 82
| April 14, 1985
| Detroit
| L 113–116
|
|
|
| Richfield Coliseum
| 36–46

Playoffs

|- align="center" bgcolor="#ffcccc"
| 1
| April 18, 1985
| @ Boston
| L 123–126
| Hinson (24)
| Hinson (11)
| Bagley (11)
| Boston Garden14,890
| 0–1
|- align="center" bgcolor="#ffcccc"
| 2
| April 20, 1985
| @ Boston
| L 106–108
| Free (25)
| Hinson (6)
| Free (7)
| Boston Garden14,890
| 0–2
|- align="center" bgcolor="#ccffcc"
| 3
| April 23, 1985
| Boston
| W 105–98
| Free (32)
| Hinson (9)
| Bagley (15)
| Richfield Coliseum20,900
| 1–2
|- align="center" bgcolor="#ffcccc"
| 4
| April 25, 1985
| Boston
| L 115–117
| Free (30)
| Shelton (8)
| Bagley (10)
| Richfield Coliseum20,900
| 1–3

Awards, records, and honors

Player stats

Regular season

Playoffs

Player Statistics Citation:

Transactions

References

Cleveland Cavaliers seasons
Cle
Cleveland
Cleveland